Rurutu Airport is an airport on Rurutu in French Polynesia . The airport was built in 1977.

Airlines and destinations

Passenger

Statistics

References

External links
 

Airports in French Polynesia